North Wootton is a village and civil parish, on the River Redlake,  south east of Wells, and  south west of Shepton Mallet in the Mendip district of Somerset, England.

The village is on the Monarch's Way long-distance footpath.

History

The name Wootton means the settlement in or by a wood. The North being added in the 20th century to distinguish it from Wootton Courtenay.

The estate was granted by King Edmund to Aethelnoth, his minister in 946, and then to Glastonbury Abbey.

The parish was part of the hundred of Glaston Twelve Hides.

Governance

The parish council has responsibility for local issues, including setting an annual precept (local rate) to cover the council's operating costs and producing annual accounts for public scrutiny. The parish council evaluates local planning applications and works with the local police, district council officers, and neighbourhood watch groups on matters of crime, security, and traffic. The parish council's role also includes initiating projects for the maintenance and repair of parish facilities, as well as consulting with the district council on the maintenance, repair, and improvement of highways, drainage, footpaths, public transport, and street cleaning. Conservation matters (including trees and listed buildings) and environmental issues are also the responsibility of the council.

The village falls within the Non-metropolitan district of Mendip, which was formed on 1 April 1974 under the Local Government Act 1972, having previously been part of Wells Rural District, which is responsible for local planning and building control, local roads, council housing, environmental health, markets and fairs, refuse collection and recycling, cemeteries and crematoria, leisure services, parks, and tourism.

Somerset County Council is responsible for running the largest and most expensive local services such as education, social services, libraries, main roads, public transport, policing and fire services, trading standards, waste disposal and strategic planning.

It is also part of the Somerton and Frome county constituency represented in the House of Commons of the Parliament of the United Kingdom. It elects one Member of Parliament (MP) by the first past the post system of election.

Commerce

Despite its small size, the village of North Wootton is home to several businesses, including the popular campsite Greenacres Camping, and Honey Tree Publishing Ltd.

Religious sites

The Church of St Peter dates from the 14th century and is a Grade II* listed building.

References

External links

North Wootton village web site

Villages in Mendip District
Civil parishes in Somerset